This list of 2016 motorsport champions is a list of national or international auto racing series with championships decided by the points or positions earned by a driver from multiple races where the season was completed during the 2016 calendar year.

Open wheel racing

Touring car racing

Sports car and GT

Rallying

Dirt oval racing

Truck racing

Air racing

Drifting

Drag racing

Motorcycles

Road racing

Dirt racing

Stock car racing

See also
 List of motorsport championships

References

Champions
2016